Melecio Álvarez Garrido (Villalpando, 21 March 1896 - Paterna, 23 October 1940) was a Leonese anarcho-syndicalist.

Biography 
A waiter by profession, he was affiliated with the National Confederation of Labor (CNT), forming part of the CNT Gastronomy Union in Valencia. During the period of the Second Spanish Republic he participated in various political activities. After the outbreak of the Spanish Civil War he joined the confederal militias, participating in the organization of an anarchist column. He was in favor of the militarization of the militias, openly opposing José Pellicer Gandía - founder of the Iron Column. Later he became part of the political commissariat of the People's Army of the Republic. During the war, he served as commissar of the 82nd and 92nd mixed brigades, fighting on various fronts. He was captured by the nationalists at the end of the war, He was shot in Paterna on 23 October 1940.

References

Bibliography 
 
 
 

1896 births
1940 deaths
Spanish anarchists
Confederación Nacional del Trabajo members
People executed by Francoist Spain
Politicians from Castile and León
Spanish military personnel of the Spanish Civil War (Republican faction)

Executed anarchists